Croatian Railway Museum is a specialized technical museum in Croatian capital Zagreb, located on the premises of Zagreb Glavni kolodvor, the main railway station of Zagreb.

History 

Efforts to establish a railway museum in Zagreb go back to 1966, when Zagreb railway administration decided to establish the Railway Department within the Zagreb Technical Museum, but due to limited space and lack of staff, it could not be carried out.

The museum was established on 19 March 1991 by the Croatian Railways as the Railway Museum of Croatia. It was renamed to the current name by a decision of Croatian Railways on 20 May 2001.

References

External links 

 

Museums established in 1991
1991 establishments in Croatia
Museums in Zagreb
Transport in Zagreb
Rail transport preservation in Croatia
Donji grad, Zagreb
Technology museums in Croatia